The Norfolk Coast Area of Outstanding Natural Beauty is a protected landscape in Norfolk, England.  It covers over 450 km2 of coastal and agricultural land from The Wash in the west through coastal marshes and cliffs to the sand dunes at Winterton in the east.  It was designated AONB in 1968, under the National Parks and Access to the Countryside Act 1949.

The area includes; Hunstanton, Wells-next-the-Sea, Blakeney, Sheringham, Cromer and Mundesley. The AONB boundary on the seaward side is the mean low water mark, corresponding to the limit of the planning authority of its local authority partners. The terrain behind the coast is rolling chalk land and glacial moraine, including the almost 300 foot (90m) high Cromer Ridge.

Nature reserves in the area include two National Nature Reserves, Blakeney Point and the Winterton Dunes (one of the country's finest dune systems). The Heritage Coast stretch of the AONB is a Site of Special Scientific Interest, a candidate Special Area of Conservation (SAC) and a Special Protection Area. The Peddars Way and Norfolk Coast Path National Trail pass through the AONB.

Threats
East of Weybourne there is severe coastal erosion. Managed retreat is likely to be the long-term solution to rising sea levels along much of the rest of the North Norfolk coast,

References

External links
 Norfolk Coast AONB Website

Environment of Norfolk
Areas of Outstanding Natural Beauty in England
Protected areas established in 1968
Protected areas of Norfolk
 
Ramsar sites in England